Believers Church Medical College Hospital (BCMCH) is a healthcare institution of Believers eastern Church based in Thiruvalla, Kerala, India. The Medical College is attached to a 743-bed, multi-speciality hospital. The Medical College, established in 2016, is situated in a campus of about  connected by rail and road.

Overview

Accreditation 
The BCMCH is affiliated to the Kerala University of Health Sciences (KUHS) which was established under the 'Kerala University of Health Sciences Act 2010', for ensuring  proper and systematic instruction, teaching, training and research in Modern Medicine, Homoeopathy and Indian Systems of Medicine including Ayurveda, Siddha, Yoga, Naturopathy, Unani and other allied sciences and also to have uniformity in the various academic programmes in medical and allied subjects in the State of Kerala. BCMCH is also accredited by the National Accreditation Board for Hospitals and Health Care Providers (NABH). Apart from the accreditation of the hospital with NABH, it also has a lab accredited by National Accreditation Board for Labs (NABL). The nursing excellence certificate by NABH was the latest addition to this

Facilities

Emergency 
The hospital has a 35-bed Emergency Department, which includes triage beds, observation areas, multi-bed Resuscitation bay, treats around 3,0000 patients annually. This department has a full-fledged Advanced Cardiac Life Support and Basic Life Support mobile ICUs, with trained emergency doctors and paramedics, providing vital pre-hospital care while transporting critically ill or injured patients.

Outpatient 
There is a one-time mandatory registration for all patients before the consultation. The patient will be issued a  Unique Hospital Identification (UHID) number given by the Registration Office. For appointments, the patient has to produce their registration card.

ICU 

The hospital has 25 Intensive Care Units for pediatric, neonatal and adult patients.

Operation Theaters 
There are 10 Operation Theaters for conducting various surgeries. The OTs facilitate monitoring, volumetric analysis, HEPA filters etc. In the year 2016, a total of 8270 surgeries were performed in BCMCH, including complex cases in the fields of neurosurgery, orthopaedics, hepatobiliary surgery, gastrointestinal surgery, plastic surgery, cardiothoracic surgery, pediatric surgery, onco-surgery, gynecology, urology, general surgery, ENT etc. 1254 eye surgeries were also performed in the same period. The theatre staff has more than 100 nurses and technicians, along with the surgeons and anaesthetists.

Diagnostic Services 
The following diagnostic facilities are available in the hospital:
 Radiology: X-Ray, Ultrasound, Colour Doppler, Mammography, BMD, CT Scan, 3D CT Angiography, PACS.
 Nuclear Medicine
 Interventional Radiology
 Pathology: Biochemistry, Clinical Pathology, Haematology, Histopathology, Microbiology, Serology.

Congenital Heart Disease Management Program  
The Indian government is set to launch the congenital heart disease management program Hridayam - for little hearts. Its health department is in the process of signing up MoU with BCMCH to empanel it for congenital heart problem treatment.

References

External links

Website of Believers Church Medical College Hospital

Christian hospitals
Hospitals in Kerala
Medical colleges in Kerala
Universities and colleges in Pathanamthitta district
Educational institutions established in 2016
2016 establishments in Kerala